Marcos Gusmão (born 22 May 1966 in São Paulo) is a Brazilian professional football manager. He has been the manager of the Papua New Guinea national team since 2021.

Career
From 2004 until 2007 he coached the Papua New Guinea national football team being in charge of one match.

He was reappointed to the position in December 2021.

References

External links
Profile at Mybestplay.com
Profile at Privatecoaches.com

Brazilian football managers
Expatriate football managers in Papua New Guinea
Papua New Guinea national football team managers
Sportspeople from São Paulo
1966 births
Living people
Brazilian expatriate football managers
Brazilian expatriate sportspeople in Papua New Guinea